CRYPTREC is the Cryptography Research and Evaluation Committees set up by the Japanese Government to evaluate and recommend cryptographic techniques for government and industrial use. It is comparable in many respects to the European Union's NESSIE project and to the Advanced Encryption Standard process run by National Institute of Standards and Technology in the U.S.

Comparison with NESSIE 
There is some overlap, and some conflict, between the NESSIE selections and the CRYPTREC draft recommendations. Both efforts include some of the best cryptographers in the world therefore conflicts in their selections and recommendations should be examined with care. For instance, CRYPTREC recommends several 64 bit block ciphers while NESSIE selected none, but CRYPTREC was obliged by its terms of reference to take into account existing standards and practices, while NESSIE was not. Similar differences in terms of reference account for CRYPTREC recommending at least one stream cipher, RC4, while the NESSIE report specifically said that it was notable that they had not selected any of those considered. RC4 is widely used in the SSL/TLS protocols; nevertheless, CRYPTREC recommended that it only be used with 128-bit keys. Essentially the same consideration led to CRYPTREC's inclusion of 160-bit message digest algorithms, despite their suggestion that they be avoided in new system designs. Also, CRYPTREC was unusually careful to examine variants and modifications of the techniques, or at least to discuss their care in doing so; this resulted in particularly detailed recommendations regarding them.

Background and sponsors 
CRYPTREC includes members from Japanese academia, industry, and government. It was started in May 2000 by combining efforts from several agencies who were investigating methods and techniques for implementing 'e-Government' in Japan. Presently, it is sponsored by
the Ministry of Economy Trade and Industry,
the Ministry of Public Management, Home Affairs and Post and Telecommunications,
the Telecommunications Advancement Organization, and
the Information-Technology Promotion Agency.

Responsibilities 
It is also the organization that provides technical evaluation and recommendations concerning regulations that implement Japanese laws. Examples include the Electronic Signatures and Certification Services (Law 102 of FY2000, taking effect as from April 2001), the Basic Law on the Formulation of an Advanced Information and Telecommunications Network Society of 2000 (Law 144 of FY2000), and the Public Individual Certification Law of December 2002. Furthermore, CRYPTEC has responsibilities with regard to the Japanese contribution to the ISO/IEC JTC 1/SC27 standardization effort.

Selection 
In the first release in 2003, many Japanese ciphers were selected for the "e-Government Recommended Ciphers List": CIPHERUNICORN-E (NEC), Hierocrypt-L1 (Toshiba), and MISTY1 (Mitsubishi Electric) as 64 bit block ciphers, Camellia (Nippon Telegraph and Telephone, Mitsubishi Electric), CIPHERUNICORN-A (NEC), Hierocrypt-3 (Toshiba), and SC2000 (Fujitsu) as 128 bit block ciphers, and finally MUGI and MULTI-S01 (Hitachi) as stream ciphers.

In the revised release of 2013, the list was divided into three: "e-Government Recommended Ciphers List", "Candidate Recommended Ciphers List", and "Monitored Ciphers List". Most of the Japanese ciphers listed in the previous list (except for Camellia) have moved from the "Recommended Ciphers List" to the "Candidate Recommended Ciphers List". There were several new proposals, such as CLEFIA (Sony) as a 128 bit block cipher as well as KCipher-2 (KDDI) and Enocoro-128v2 (Hitachi) as stream ciphers. However, only KCipher-2 has been listed on the "e-Government Recommended Ciphers List". The reason why most Japanese ciphers have not been selected as "Recommended Ciphers" is not that these ciphers are necessarily unsafe, but that these ciphers are not widely used in commercial products, open-source projects, governmental systems, or international standards. There is the possibility that ciphers listed on "Candidate Recommended Ciphers List" will be moved to the "e-Government Recommended Ciphers List" when they are utilized more widely.

In addition, 128 bit RC4 and SHA-1 are listed on "Monitored Ciphers List". These are unsafe and only permitted to remain compatible with old systems.

After the revision in 2013, there are several updates such as addition of ChaCha20-Poly1305, EdDSA and SHA-3, move of Triple DES to Monitored list, and deletion of RC4, etc.

CRYPTREC Ciphers List

e-Government Recommended Ciphers List 
Public key ciphers
Signature 
DSA
ECDSA
RSA-PSS
RSASSA-PKCS1-v1_5
Confidentiality
RSA-OAEP
Key exchange
DH
ECDH
Symmetric key ciphers
64-bit block ciphers
N/A
128-bit block ciphers
AES
Camellia
Stream ciphers
KCipher-2
Hash functions
SHA-256
SHA-384
SHA-512
Modes of operation
Encryption modes
CBC
CFB
CTR
OFB
Authenticated encryption modes
CCM
GCM
Message authentication codes
CMAC
HMAC
Authenticated encryption
N/A
Entity authentication
ISO/IEC 9798-2
ISO/IEC 9798-3

Candidate Recommended Ciphers List 
Public key ciphers
Signature 
EdDSA
Confidentiality
N/A
Key exchange
PSEC-KEM
Symmetric key ciphers
64-bit block ciphers
CIPHERUNICORN-E
Hierocrypt-L1
MISTY1
128-bit block ciphers
CIPHERUNICORN-A
CLEFIA
Hierocrypt-3
SC2000
Stream ciphers
MUGI
Enocoro-128v2
MULTI-S01
Hash functions
SHA-512/256
SHA3-256
SHA3-384
SHA3-512
SHAKE128
SHAKE256
Modes of operation
Encryption modes
XTS
Authenticated encryption modes
N/A
Message authentication codes
PC-MAC-AES
Authenticated encryption
ChaCha20-Poly1305
Entity authentication
ISO/IEC 9798-4

Monitored Ciphers List 
Public key ciphers
Signature 
N/A
Confidentiality
RSAES-PKCS1-v1_5
Key exchange
N/A
Symmetric key ciphers
64-bit block ciphers
3-key Triple DES
128-bit block ciphers
N/A
Stream ciphers
N/A
Hash functions
RIPEMD-160
SHA-1
Modes of operation
Encryption modes
N/A
Authenticated encryption modes
N/A
Message authentication codes
CBC-MAC
Authenticated encryption
N/A
Entity authentication
N/A

References

External links 
 
 The list of ciphers that should be referred to in the procurement for the e-Government system (CRYPTREC Ciphers List) (in Japanese)

Cryptography standards
Government research
Standards of Japan